UPDF may refer to:
Uganda People's Defence Force
UP Diksiyonaryong Filipino (UP Filipino Dictionary)
United People's Democratic Front (Bangladesh)